Weber Carburetors is an automotive manufacturing company founded in 1923, known for their carburetors.

History
Eduardo Weber began his automotive career working for Fiat, first at their Turin plant (in 1914) and later at a dealership in Bologna. After WWI, with gasoline prices high, he reached a certain success in selling conversion kits for running trucks on kerosene instead. The company was established as Fabbrica Italiana Carburatori Weber in 1923 when Weber produced carburetors as part of a conversion kit for Fiats. Weber pioneered the use of two-stage twin-barrel carburetors, with two venturis of different sizes (the smaller one for low-speed running and the larger one optimised for high-speed use).

In the 1930s, Weber began producing twin-barrel carburetors for motor racing, where two barrels of the same size were used. These were arranged so that each cylinder of the engine had its own carburetor barrel. These carburetors found use in Maserati and Alfa Romeo racing cars. Twin updraft Weber carburetors fed superchargers on the 1938 Alfa Romeo 8C competition vehicles.

Fiat assumed control of the company in 1952 following Weber's disappearance in 1945. In time, Weber carburetors were fitted to standard production cars and factory racing applications from automotive marques such as Abarth, Alfa Romeo, Aston Martin, BMW, Chrysler, Ferrari, Fiat, Ford, IKA, Lamborghini, Lancia, Lotus, Maserati, Morgan, Porsche, Renault, Triumph and Volkswagen.

In 1986, Fiat also took control of Weber competitor Solex, and merged the two into a single company (Raggruppamento Controllo Motore, or the "Engine Management Group"). This was then reorganized as Magneti Marelli Powertrain S.p.A. in 1986. Genuine Weber carburetors were produced in Bologna, Italy, up until 1992, when production was transferred to Madrid, Spain, where they continue to be made today. Weber carburettors are made in a facility owned by LCN Automotive  based in Spain. There are only two direct distributors of Spanish Weber carburetors - Webcon based in the UK and WorldPac known as RedlineWeber in the US. Webcon operate a Global distribution chain via a long established network of Dealers and specialists, many of whom are located in the EU.

Modern use 
In modern times, fuel injection has replaced carburetors in both production cars and most modern motor racing, although Weber carburetors are still used extensively in classic and historic racing. They are also supplied as high-quality replacements for problematic OEM carburetors. Weber fuel system components are distributed by Magneti Marelli, Webcon UK Ltd., and, in North America, by several organizations, including Worldpac, marketing under the Redline name. Other suppliers include Overseas Distributing, Pierce Manifolds & Lynx Weber in Australia 

Weber carburetors are sold for both street and off-road use, with the twin-choke sidedraft DCOE (Doppio Corpo Orizzontale E; "Double-Body Horizontal E") being the most common one. They are sold in what is referred to as a Weber conversion kit. A Weber conversion kit is a complete upgrade package consisting of a Weber carburetor, intake manifold or manifold adapter, throttle linkage, air filter, and all of the hardware needed for installation on a vehicle.

Model codes
Weber carburetors are marked with a model code on the mounting flange, the body, or on the cover of the float chamber. This begins with a number which originally indicated the diameter (in millimetres) of the throttle bore, but later lost this significance. If this number has a single pair of digits, both chokes are of the same diameter and operate together; if it has two pairs of digits separated by a stroke (e.g. 28/36), there are primary and secondary chokes that are opened one after the other, usually of differing diameter.

These numbers are followed by a group of letters, which indicate various features: the DCOE is a sidedraft unit, all others being downdraft; the DCD has a piston-type starter valve as opposed to a strangler choke; and so on. After the letters there will be a further number, which may be followed by a letter, e.g. 4B, 13A; these indicate the series, which in turn almost always indicates the original equipment fitment of the product. The full designation might be 40 DCOE 29, 45 DCOE 9, etc.

Copies
DCOE, IDF, IDA or DGV carburetors can be found made by other companies, like EMPI, FAJS or REEDMORAL, LOREADA, often at half the price of the originals. Often these are called 'fake' by Weber users. All copies are manufactured in China and are 100% copy, so all parts are interchangeable. Operation however may vary from the original, due to inaccurate drilling and poorly calibrated parts. Mostly noticeable during idle or cruise. Although internal parts can be swapped for original

Setting
Proper carburetor jetting is based on engine displacement, RPM and engine usage. Either one or more carburetors connected to each other are used. For small engines, even only one half of the carburetor was used, with the other half blinded and partially cut off. The basic carburetor size can be selected by the butterfly valves, for DCO/DCOE the sizes are 38/40/42/45/48/50/55, with 40/45/48/50/55 being more common and available today. Jet size is based on choke size, and choke size is just based on engine displacement, RPM and application. Today you can simplify the calculation work and use an online jetting calculator  or go through the jetting tables and match your case.

See also 

List of Italian companies

Notes

References 
 Weber Carburettors Owners Workshop Manual, Haynes Publishing, 
 Weber Carburetors, Pat Braden, 
 Weber Tuning Manual, available from Webcon UK Ltd

External links 

 Weber DCOE jetting calculator
 Weber Parts and Info
 Exploded views for Weber carburetors, parts

Engine fuel system technology
Fiat
Carburetor manufacturers
Auto parts suppliers of Italy
Italian brands
Manufacturing companies established in 1923
Italian companies established in 1923
Manufacturing companies disestablished in 1992
1992 disestablishments in Italy